The Streets of Illusion is a 1917 American silent drama film directed by William Parke and starring Gladys Hulette, J.H. Gilmour and Richard Barthelmess.

Cast
 Gladys Hulette as Beam 
 J.H. Gilmour as Her Father 
 William Parke Jr. as Her Brother 
 Richard Barthelmess as Donald Morton 
 William Dudley as Colonel Thompson 
 Warren Cook as His Father 
 Kathryn Adams

References

Bibliography
 Craig W. Campbell. Reel America and World War I: A Comprehensive Filmography and History of Motion Pictures in the United States, 1914-1920. McFarland, 1985.

External links
 

1917 films
1917 drama films
1910s English-language films
American silent feature films
Silent American drama films
American black-and-white films
Films directed by William Parke
Pathé Exchange films
1910s American films